Holly Creek is a stream in the U.S. state of Georgia. It is a tributary to the Conasauga River.

The creek's name comes from the Native Americans of the area, who saw holly growing along its course. An alternative spelling was "Holley Creek".

A portion of Holly Creek, near its source in the Cohutta Wilderness, runs through Holly Creek Preserve and is under the protection of The Nature Conservancy. The Conservancy's site states that Holly Creek, along with Dill Creek, is "a stronghold for diverse and rare aquatic species, whose health, in turn, affects the Conasauga." Holly Creek is important to the Conasauga Watershed. Reducing erosion and sediment in the stream is a goal of Georgia's water quality and conservation programs. Holly Creek is a habitat for freshwater mussels. It is a coldwater stream.

Holly creek flows in a westerly direction through the Chattahoochee National Forest in Murray County, Georgia, toward the Conasauga River at the Whitfield County line.

Nearby branches 

The following branches or streams connect to Holly Creek at the specified coordinates. These may be branches, tributaries, or streams that run confluently for a time. The unknown streams may or may not be named, but may be identified by their coordinates.

Unknown at 

Moreland Branch 
    
Unknown at 

3rd confluence (Boatwright Branch) 

Unknown at Mulberry Gap Road 

Unknown at 

Shanty Creek at 

Unknown at 

Unknown at 

Emery Creek 

Leadmine Branch (other name or confluent branch) 

Dill Creek 

Neal Branch (other name or nearby branch)

Rigley Branch 

Mill Creek 

Muskrat Creek 
    
Dry Prong 

Rock Creek 

Unknown at 

Chicken Creek 

Lick Branch 

Stewart Branch 

Wright Branch (other name or nearby branch)

Holly Creek widens (dam or reservoir?) 

Rock Creek 

Buck Creek 

Bullpen Branch 
   
Casey Springs Branch 

Unknown branch at 

Unknown branch1 (surrounds islet)  

Unknown branch2 (surrounds islet)  

Branch1 or 2 reconnects 

Pettiet Branch 

Unknown or fork of Pettiet 

Unknown, crosses oxbow curve (1) and reconnects 

Unknown at  encompasses small islet

Unknown at 

Fork encompasses islet 

Unknown, crossed oxbow curve (2) 

Unknown at 

Conasauga River (mouth of Holly Creek)

References

Rivers of Georgia (U.S. state)
Rivers of Murray County, Georgia